If I Could Only Remember My Name is the debut solo album by American singer-songwriter David Crosby, released in February 1971 on Atlantic Records. Guests on the album include Jerry Garcia, Graham Nash, Neil Young, Joni Mitchell, and other prominent West Coast musicians of the era. It was one of four high-profile albums released by each member of Crosby, Stills, Nash & Young in the wake of their chart-topping 1970 album Déjà Vu.

The album peaked at No. 12 on the Billboard Top LPs chart and earned a RIAA gold record certification in the United States. It initially received negative reviews from critics, but has gone on to achieve cult fandom and praise from modern critics.

Background
The album was released following the success of the 1970 Crosby, Stills, Nash, & Young album Déjà Vu. Its popularity contributed to the success of the four albums released by each of the members in its wake – Neil Young's After the Gold Rush (1970), Stephen Stills' self-titled solo debut (1970), this 1971 Crosby debut, and Graham Nash's Songs for Beginners (1971). The period was also one of mourning for Crosby following the death of his girlfriend Christine Hinton in a 1969 car accident. Grief stricken, Crosby coped by doing hard drugs and spending large amounts of time in the studio, where he "felt safe." Recording sessions took place at the recently opened Wally Heider Studios in San Francisco.

While spending extended time in the studio, Crosby invited many of his musician friends to take part. Among them were Nash, Young, Joni Mitchell, members of the Grateful Dead (most frequently Jerry Garcia), Jefferson Airplane, Quicksilver Messenger Service, and Santana. The ensemble was given the informal moniker of The Planet Earth Rock and Roll Orchestra by Jefferson Airplane bandleader, longtime Crosby associate and fellow science fiction fan Paul Kantner, although Crosby noted that the P.E.R.R.O. was only a willful invention of Kantner's rather than a collective project. Many from this agglomeration, including recording engineer Stephen Barncard, also worked on Kantner's Blows Against the Empire, Songs for Beginners by Nash, and the Grateful Dead's American Beauty, all recorded in part concurrently with the Crosby album at Wally Heider Studios. According to Crosby, These were all good friends and good people and they knew that I was lonely and they knew also that I was slightly nuts at the time, and they would come and we would play music ... I would sit down with whoever did show up – most often Jerry [Garcia] – and start playing a song ... If you started playing music, he wanted to play. And we had two-track tape running constantly the entire night. And the minute that something started to happen, the 24-track would start to roll – or maybe it was 12 track back then ... And then I would start layering harmonies onto it, and that was a lot of fun."

Music
Even with the star-studded guest line-up, the final two songs feature Crosby alone, and only five songs have actual lyrics, "Orleans" being a 15th Century round listing various French cathedrals. Crosby's song "Laughing" had been written earlier in his time with CSNY, while a demo version of "Song with No Words" had been tried out during the sessions for Déjà Vu and would appear on the 1991 CSN retrospective package. "Cowboy Movie" recounted the tale of a group of Old West outlaws torn apart by a femme fatale; in actuality a recounting in thinly-veiled form of the encounter by the quartet with Rita Coolidge and her effect on the romantic aspirations of at least two of them, as identified immediately by Nash.

The album is rooted in the folk-rock tradition, but like much of Crosby's work it also borrows tunings, time signatures, and vocal phrasings from jazz. Some writers have labeled it an early example of psychedelic folk, with Billboard describing the music as "psychedelic folk dirges."  Pitchfork stated that "[t]he music feels the way a dream sounds when you try to retell it in the morning: foggy, only loosely coherent, dissolving in real time."

Release
If I Could Only Remember My Name was released in February 1971 on Atlantic Records. Two singles were taken from the album, including the minor hit "Music Is Love", a collaboration with Nash and Young that was released in April 1971 and peaked at No. 95 on the Billboard Hot 100. The album has remained continuously in print.

In October 1990, a compact disc version was released, having been digitally remastered from the original master tapes, using the equipment and techniques of the day, by Barncard. A double-compact disc version appeared in November 2006, with an audio disc remastered in HDCD, including a bonus track (the hitherto unreleased "Kids and Dogs", previously earmarked for an unreleased Crosby solo album slated to appear on Capitol Records in the early 1980s) and a second DVD Audio disc of the original album remixed for 5.1 digital Surround Sound.

On October 15, 2021, a 50th anniversary re-issue of the album was released with numerous out-takes and demos, as well as liner notes by Steve Silberman.

Critical reception and legacy

If I Could Only Remember My Name was initially panned by many music critics. Writing for Rolling Stone, Lester Bangs claimed that "the playing is sloppy as hell… Crosby’s singing here is even blander and more monotonously one-dimensional than Stills’ on his solo album," concluding that it is "not likely to go down in history, but it is not a bad album." He memorably deemed it "a perfect aural aid to digestion when you're having guests over for dinner, provided they’re brothers and sisters enough to get behind it, of course." Village Voice critic Robert Christgau gave the album a D− rating and dismissed it as a "disgraceful performance". Crosby has said of the contemporaneous reviews: "They were looking for another record that was full of big, flashy lead guitar and blues licks and screaming lyrics ... [If I Could Only Remember My Name] was not where everything else was going, so they thought it was irrelevant."

The album went on to achieve cult status and praise from latter-day critics for its austere mood, eclectic improvisation and otherworldly harmony singing. In 2000, it was voted number 156 in the third edition of Colin Larkin's book All Time Top 1000 Albums. He stated "if you are not familiar with this miraculous record, please take the risk." A Head Heritage review of the 2006 reissue compares the album with Nick Drake and the acoustic material of Meddle-era Pink Floyd. It has been labeled a progenitor of the freak folk genre.

In 2010, Crosby's album was listed second, behind the Beatles' Revolver, on the "Top 10 Pop Albums of All Time" published in the Vatican City newspaper L'Osservatore Romano.

On 18 November 2013, Crosby appeared on an edition of the BBC Radio 4 program Mastertapes, which was dedicated to the making of the album. The following day, he took part in the program's "B-side" edition, answering audience questions and performing songs from the album. In 2016, Japanese musician Cornelius included If I Could Only Remember My Name in his list of "10 Albums Everyone Needs to Hear".

In 2019, the album's title was partly adopted for the Cameron Crowe documentary on Crosby, David Crosby: Remember My Name.

Track listing
All songs written by David Crosby except where noted

Side one
"Music Is Love" (Graham Nash, Neil Young, David Crosby) – 3:16
"Cowboy Movie" – 8:02
"Tamalpais High (At About 3)" – 3:29
"Laughing" – 5:20
Side two
"What Are Their Names" (Neil Young, Jerry Garcia, Phil Lesh, Michael Shrieve, David Crosby) – 4:09
"Traction in the Rain" – 3:40
"Song with No Words (Tree with No Leaves)" – 5:53
"Orleans" (traditional, arranged by David Crosby) – 1:56
"I'd Swear There Was Somebody Here" – 1:19
2006 reissue bonus track
"Kids and Dogs" – 7:01

2021 50th anniversary edition bonus disc
Demos:
Recorded March 1968:
"Riff 1" – 2:22
Recorded March 28, 1968; produced by Paul A. Rothchild:
"Tamalpais High (At About 3)" – 1:53
"Kids and Dogs" – 3:07
"Games" – 3:17
Recorded May 31, 1968; engineered by Michael Nemo:
"Laughing" – 3:58 
Recorded 1969:
"Song with No Words (Tree with No Leaves)" – 3:12
Recorded 1970:
"The Wall Song" – 4:15
"Where Will I Be?" – 3:41
Sessions:
"Cowboy Movie" (alternate version) – 10:57
"Bach Mode (Pre-Critical Mass)" – 2:00
"Coast Road" – 5:16
"Dancer" – 5:03
"Fugue" – 2:03

Personnel

Musicians
 David Crosby – vocals, guitars
 Graham Nash – guitar, vocals  
 Jerry Garcia – electric guitar ; pedal steel guitar ; guitars ; vocal 
 Neil Young – guitars, vocals ; bass, vibraphone, congas 
 Jorma Kaukonen – electric guitar 
 Laura Allan – autoharp, vocal 
 Gregg Rolie – piano 
 Phil Lesh – bass ; vocal 
 Jack Casady – bass  
 Bill Kreutzmann – drums ; tambourine 
 Michael Shrieve – drums 
 Mickey Hart – drums 
 Joni Mitchell – vocals 
 David Freiberg, Paul Kantner, Grace Slick – vocals 

Production
 David Crosby – producer
 Stephen Barncard – engineer
 Henry Lewy – additional engineering on "Music Is Love"
 Gary Burden – art direction, design
 Robert Hammer, Gary Burden, Henry Diltz, Herb Greene, Salli Sasche, Joel Bernstein, Graham Nash, Ronald Stone – photography
 Elliot Roberts, Ronald Stone – management
 David Geffen – direction
2006 reissue:
 Bill Dooley – CD mastering
 Steve Hall – DVD audio engineering
 Matthew Greenwald – liner notes
2021 reissue:
 Patrick Milligan, Joel Bernstein, Stephen Barncard – producers
 Dave Collins – mastering
 Jamie Howarth, John Chester – tape restoration and speed correction
 Steve Silberman – liner notes

Charts

Certification

References

External links
Album online on Radio3Net a radio channel of Romanian Radio Broadcasting Company
 Stephen Barncard notes

1971 debut albums
Atlantic Records albums
David Crosby albums
Albums produced by David Crosby
Albums recorded at A&M Studios
Albums recorded at Wally Heider Studios